Uthuru Sulanga is a 2021 2023 Sri Lankan Sinhala post-war drama thriller film directed by Chamara Janaraj Peiris in his directorial cinema debut  and co-produced by director himself with Muhammad Ghani, Rasitha Jinasena and Kapila Nawarathna for Pics and Words Productions. It stars Eranga Jeewantha and Kavindya Dulshani in lead roles  along with Sriyantha Mendis, Sujani Menaka and Bimal Jayakodi, Dulan Manjula Liyanage in supportive roles. 

The first phase of the filming was shot in Uswewa village, Anamaduwa. The media screening was screened at Tharangani Cinema Hall on 14 January 2021. The premiere was held on 23 April 2021 at the Liberty Cinema. It was earlier planned to screen on 5 March 2021. However, it was later announced that the film will be released on 29 April 2021.  The media screening was screened at Scope Cinema CCC on 20th March 2021.  It was earlier planned to screen on 29th April 2021. However, it was later announced that the film will be released 24th of March 2023.

Plot
Uthuru Sulanga unfolds an unknown side of life of a person who seeks refuge in a then boarder village in the dry zone of Sri Lanka. The village has just buried all the memories of the staggering Northern war. He (Sunimal) finds shelter in the house of chieftain of the village ‘Ralahami mama’ who does not bother about his past but present. Sunimal whilst trying hard to get over his indelible memories of war, faces his second battle of life as he couldn't resist the charm of Yasho, Ralahami mama's daughter. When he loses his battle, the dark shadows of an unforeseen future surrounds him....again. Yet he has to discover himself, his real family and his future.

Cast
 Eranga Jeewantha as Sunimal 		
 Kavindya Dulshani	as Yashodara 	
 Sriyantha Mendis as Ralahamy Mama		
 Dulan Manjula Liyanage as Veere
 Kasuni Kavindi Fernando		
 Sujani Menaka		
 Sulakkhana Herath		
 Bimal Jayakodi		
 Rohana Beddage		
 Meena Kumari 		
 Dilhani Ekanayake		
 Sanath Gunathilake

Soundtrack
The music for Uthuru Sulanga was composed by Udara Jayakody, with lyrics written by Thushani Bulumulle.

References

External links
 Uthuru Sulanga on Sinhala Cinema Database
 Uthuru Sulanga official trailer on YouTube
 

2020s Sinhala-language films
2021 films
Sri Lankan drama films
2021 drama films